Luis Miguel Silveira from the Technical University of Lisbon  was named Fellow of the Institute of Electrical and Electronics Engineers (IEEE) in 2012 for contributions to analysis and modeling of VLSI interconnects.

References

Fellow Members of the IEEE
Living people
Academic staff of the Technical University of Lisbon
Year of birth missing (living people)
Place of birth missing (living people)